50 meter running target mixed is an ISSF shooting event, shot with a .22-calibre rifle at a target depicting a boar moving sideways across a 10-meter wide opening. A part of the ISSF World Shooting Championships since 1970, it differs from 50 meter running target in that the slow runs (target visible for 5 seconds) and the fast runs (target visible for 2.5 seconds) are randomized so the shooter does not know in advance which speed to expect.

World Championships, Men

World Championships, Men team

World Championships, total medals

Current world records 

ISSF shooting events
Rifle shooting sports
Running target shooting